Piper fungiforme is a plant in the family Piperaceae endemic to northeast Queensland, Australia.

Description
The apex is acuminate and the base cuneate and asymmetric. There are 2 or 3 pairs of lateral veins, all of which divert from the midvein in the basal portion of the leaf.

This species is dioecious, meaning that functionally female and functionally male flowers are borne on separate plants.

The fruit is an infructescence, that is, a mass consisting of the combined fruit of the individual flowers in the female inflorescence, like the pineapple and mulberry. When mature it is bright red and fleshy.

Phenology
Flowering occurs from June to September, fruit ripen from December to March.

Taxonomy
Piper fungiforme was first formally described by T.M. Spokes, and published in edition 2 of Flora of Australia in 2007. The type specimen is a collection made by Bernard Hyland from the Leo creek area of Cape York Peninsula.

Etymology
The species epithet fungiforme is Latin for "mushroom-headed", which is a reference to the "shape of the connective in stamens of the male spikes".

Distribution and habitat

It will occasionally reach the canopy.

Conservation
This species is listed by the Queensland Department of Environment and Science as least concern. , it has not been assessed by the International Union for the Conservation of Nature (IUCN).

References

External links
 
 
 View a map of historical sightings of this species at the Australasian Virtual Herbarium
 View observations of this species on iNaturalist

fungiforme
Endemic flora of Queensland
Plants described in 2007